The Nepalese play many sports at national as well as at international level. The most popular sport played in Nepal is cricket followed by football. The Nepal national cricket team has achieved great achievements in comparison to other sport including participation in World Cup (World T20), cricketer Sandeep Lamichhane's participation in international leagues and gaining the One Day International status. Nepal's national sport is volleyball, officially declared on 23 May 2017.

Sports events

Olympics 

Nepal first competed in the summer Olympics at the 1964 Tokyo Olympics and has competed in eleven straight summer Olympics starting from the 1972 Munich Olympics. Nepal has also competed in four winter Olympic events first competing in the 2002 Salt Late City Olympics and last competed in the event at the 2014 Sochi Olympics. As of 2018, Nepal has not won a medal in any of the Olympic events.

Asian Games 

Nepal competed at first Asian Games in 1951 at New Delhi and won its first medal at the event in the 1986 Seoul Games, winning 8 bronze medals. As of 2018, Nepal has won 2 silver medals and 22 bronze medals at the event.

South Asian Games 

Nepal has competed in every edition of the South Asian Games and has hosted the event in 1984, 1999 and 2019. As of 2019, Nepal is the fourth-most successful country, winning 679 medals winning 130 gold medals, 182 silver medals and 367 bronze medals.

National Games 

The Nepal Olympic Committee and the National Sports Council hosts the National Games of Nepal every two or three years. The event is meant to identify talent for the South Asian Games, Asian Games and Olympic Games as well as develop sporting infrastructure throughout the country. The National Games have been held eight times with the first event being held in 1982 at Kathmandu.

By sport

Team sports

Cricket 

The Nepal national cricket team is controlled by the Cricket Association of Nepal (CAN) which was founded in 1946. CAN became a member of the National Sports Council in 1961 and was awarded affiliate status by the International Cricket Council in 1988 and since 1996 has been recognized as an associate member. Nepal has been successful in regional events organized by the Asian Cricket Council, placing first in the ACC Fast Track Countries Tournament in 2006/07 and sharing the title with the United Arab Emirates in the 2012 ACC Trophy Elite. The women's team made their debut in 2007 and has qualified for the Women's Asia Cup in 2012 and 2016. 

Nepal qualified for the 2014 ICC World Twenty20 which was the only appearance by the senior men's team at a major ICC event, which also gave them Twenty20 International (T20I) until 2015. The national under-19 team has qualified for the Under-19 Cricket World Cup seven times including winning the Plate Championship in 2006. 
Nepal claimed One Day International (ODI) status for the first time with their six wicket win over Papua New Guinea in the 2018 Cricket World Cup Qualifier play off encounter on 15 March 2018. The men and women's team both currently have T20I status as a result of an ICC decision to expand the status to all member nations.

Football 

Football (also known as soccer) is one of the most popular sports in Nepal. The All Nepal Football Association (ANFA) is the governing body of Nepalese football that organizes the men's and women's national teams.

Football was introduced to Nepal during the Rana regime in the 1921. Since its introduction play was mostly limited to the Kathmandu Valley but since the turn of the millennium more tournaments have started to be organized throughout the country. The Martyr's Memorial A-Division League is the premier football league in Nepal and has been organized since 1955.

The Nepal national team was organized in 1972 after being affiliated to FIFA in 1971 and lost to China in their first official match. Nepal regularly participates in tournaments organized by the South Asian Football Federation (SAFF) and the Asian Football Confederation (AFC) and was the winner of the 2016 AFC Solidarity Cup.

Volleyball 
Volleyball was declared the national sport of Nepal on 23 May 2017. The Nepal Volleyball Association (NVA) is the governing body of volleyball in Nepal and organizes the men's and women's national teams. Nepal competes in tournaments organized by the Central Asian Zonal Volleyball Association which operates under the Asian Volleyball Confederation.

As in many other countries, women's volleyball is more popular than men's.

Individual sports

Swimming 

Gaurika Singh participated at the 2016 Summer Olympics, Rio de Janeiro, Brazil, as the youngest Olympian, representing Nepal in the Women's 100m backstroke.

Leagues

References

Further reading

External links
National sports commission of Nepal
Ministry of youth and sports, Nepal

Sports in Nepal